The Wapta ice fields are a series of glaciers popular with climbers on the border of Alberta and British Columbia in Yoho National Park in the Canadian Rockies. The Burgess shale animal Waptia takes its name from these features.  Their meltwater feeds the nearby Wapta falls.

References

Glaciers of Alberta
Glaciers of British Columbia
Yoho National Park